Levanter may refer to

 Levanter, a person who was born in the Levant, especially one of mixed European-Levantine ancestry
 Levanter (Viento de Levante), a wind that blows in the western Mediterranean Sea
The Levanter, a novel by Eric Ambler
Clé: Levanter, an ep by South Korean boyband Stray Kids

See also
Levant (disambiguation)
Levante (disambiguation)
Levantine (disambiguation)